The 2022 LET Access Series was a series of professional women's golf tournaments held from March through October 2022 across Europe. The LET Access Series is the second-tier women's professional golf tour in Europe and is the official developmental tour of the Ladies European Tour.

The season sees the introduction of the LETAS Grand Final, a season finale featuring the top 50 players in the Order of Merit, boasting the biggest prize fund in LETAS history with €80,000.

Tournament results
The table below shows the 2022 schedule. The numbers in brackets after the winners' names show the number of career wins they had on the LET Access Series up to and including that event.

Order of Merit rankings
The top 6 players on the LETAS Order of Merit earned membership of the Ladies European Tour for the 2023 season. Players finishing in positions 7–21 got to skip the first stage of the qualifying event and automatically progress to the final stage of the Lalla Aicha Tour School.

See also
2022 Ladies European Tour
2022 in golf

References

External links

LET Access Series seasons
LET Access Series
LET Access Series